Luke Jensen and Laurie Warder were the defending champions, but lost in semifinals to Petr Korda and Karel Nováček.

Boris Becker and Michael Stich won the title by defeating Petr Korda and Karel Nováček 6–4, 6–4 in the final.

Seeds
The top four seeds received a bye to the second round.

Draw

Finals

Top half

Bottom half

References

External links
 Official results archive (ATP)
 Official results archive (ITF)

Doubles